Beatnik Beatch were an American pop rock band formed in San Francisco in the 1980s. They consisted of Chris Witt Kettner (bass, vocals), Andy Sturmer (drums, vocals), and George Cole (guitar).  They also featured keyboardist Se Padilla, later replaced by Roger Manning.

In 1986, they released At The Zula Pool, under the San Francisco based indie label Industrial Records.  It was re-released with 5 tracks removed and 4 tracks added after the band was signed by Atlantic Records in 1988. Around this time Manning joined the band. 

After Beatnik Beatch disbanded at the end of 1989, Sturmer and Manning formed Jellyfish.

Discography
Albums
At the Zula Pool - (Industrial) 1986
Beatnik Beatch - (Atlantic) 1988

Single
"Beatnik Beatch" - 1988

Further reading

External links
Beginnings & Beatniks - More information at Dummyhead Central

American pop rock music groups